The Mexican national cricket team represents the country of Mexico in international cricket. They became an affiliate member of the International Cricket Council (ICC) in 2004 and their international debut was in 2006 against Costa Rica. The team made their ICC Americas Championship debut in June 2010 and in 2011 participated in the ICC Americas Division 3 tournament in Costa Rica. Mexico has also participated in the South American Championship in 2014 and 2018 winning both the time. In 2017, they became an associate member.

In April 2018, the ICC decided to grant full Twenty20 International (T20I) status to all its members. Therefore, all Twenty20 matches played between Mexico and other ICC members after 1 January 2019 will eligible for full T20I status.

History
Mexico became an affiliate member of the ICC in 2004. Their first international match was played on 19 March 2006 in the Central American Cricket Championship against Costa Rica who they beat. Prior to this there had been teams based in Mexico City that had played against Belize but these were not recognised as international fixtures. Having beaten Costa Rica in the tournament they then lost to Belize finishing second.

In 2007, Mexico hosted the Central American Cricket Championship and won it by defeating Costa Rica and El Salvador.

In 2008, Mexico travelled to El Salvador to take part in the 2nd Easter Cup. They finished second, losing to Belize but winning easily against El Salvador.

Mexico took part in the 3rd Central American Championship in 2009 in Panama under the new Twenty20 format. Mexico performed well in the tournament, winning all but one of their matches and even defeating close rivals Belize in a close fought match. As a result, they finished 2nd in the tournament.

In 2011, Mexico competed in the ICC Division 3 Americas tournament in Costa Rica finishing in 4th place.

In 2012, a youthful Mexico team participated in the 4th Volcano Cup in El Salvador finishing runners up to the hosts after defeating Guatemala.

2018-Present
In April 2018, the ICC decided to grant full Twenty20 International (T20I) status to all its members. Therefore, all Twenty20 matches played between Mexico and other ICC members after 1 January 2019 will be a full T20I.

Mexico played their first ever Twenty20 International match against Belize in the 2019 Central American Cricket Championship.

Grounds

 Reforma Athletic Club, Naucalpan
 Las Cabellerizas Cricket Ground, Dos Ríos, Mexico

Tournament history

ICC Americas Championship
2011: Division 3 – 4th place
2010: Division Four – Won

Central American Championship
2006: 2nd place
2007: Winners
2009: 2nd place
2015: 4th place
2019: 4th place

South American Championship
2014: Won
2018: Won
2019: 2nd place
2022: 4th place

Easter Cup
Mar 2008: Did not participate
Dec 2008: 2nd place

The Volcano Cup
Dec 2012: 2nd place

Players

Records

International Match Summary — Mexico
 
Last updated 6 October 2019

Twenty20 International 

 Highest team total: 134/7 v Costa Rica on 26 April 2019 at Reforma Athletic Club, Naucalpan.
 Highest individual score: 49*, Tarun Sharma v Panama on 27 April 2019 at Reforma Athletic Club, Naucalpan.
 Best individual bowling figures: 4/16, Shashikant Hirugade v Brazil on 5 October 2019 at El Cortijo Polo Club, Lima.

Most T20I runs for Mexico

Most T20I wickets for Mexico

T20I record versus other nations

Records complete to T20I #919. Last updated 6 October 2019.

Other records
For a list of selected international matches played by Mexico, see Cricket Archive.

See also
 List of Mexico Twenty20 International cricketers
 Mexico women's national cricket team

References

Further reading
 Mexico Cricket Association
 Mexico all set for CAC 2019: ‘Cricket is one of the oldest modern sports here’
 Cricket – The Mexico Way
 Mexico: Cricket in the Land of the Aztecs

Cricket in Mexico
National cricket teams
Cricket
Mexico in international cricket